Kina Cosper (born January 25, 1969) known simply as Kina, is an American musician, best known for her work with Grammy Award-nominated group Brownstone (after their nomination), and her 2000 solo single "Girl from the Gutter".

Biography

Solo career
Kina was born in Detroit. At age 21, she moved to Los Angeles, where she worked as a server and in clerical positions as she tried to establish a musical career. She found success with her single "Girl from the Gutter", which received strong airplay and peaked at number 21 on the Billboard Hot Dance Music/Club Play chart. She then released her self-titled debut album on July 18, 2000. Kina peaked at number 14 on the Billboard Heatseekers chart.

"Girl from the Gutter" was followed by the single "Me", which peaked at number 3 on the same chart. "Have a Cry" was released to radio but never charted.

To date this is Kina's only released album. Kina parted ways with DreamWorks Records shortly after the final single release.

A few years after their release, Kina's songs began popping up in various TV shows. In fall 2005 "Give & Take" and "I Love You" both appeared in an episode of the UPN sitcom Girlfriends. Kina's song "Sincerely" was also featured in the motion picture Beauty Shop.

Discography

Albums
Kina (2000)

Singles
"Girl from the Gutter" (2000)
"Me" (2000)
"Have a Cry" (2000)

References

External links
[ Allmusic Kina page]

1969 births
Living people
African-American rock singers
American contemporary R&B singers
American women pop singers
American women singer-songwriters
American rhythm and blues singer-songwriters
Singers from Detroit
20th-century American women singers
21st-century American women singers
20th-century American singers
21st-century American singers
African-American songwriters
African-American women musicians
20th-century African-American women singers
21st-century African-American women singers
Singer-songwriters from Michigan